Vasantha Doreen Peterson (born 18 October 1959), popularly as Vasanthi Chathurani, is an actress in Sri Lankan cinema and television. An extremely natural actress, Vasanthi Chathurani is one of the most successful personalities on Sri Lanka's silver and small screen. At the age 16, she made her debut as a teenager in Sumitra Peiris's Gehenu Lamai.

Personal life
She was born on 18 October 1959 in Bandarawatta, Gampaha, Sri Lanka. Her father Stanley Peterson, served in the Army, and her mother Lilavathi Peterson, died when she was a child. She had one older sister, Vinita Helen. Both of them grew up in the house of her grandmother, Maggie Nona and grandfather, K.K. Albert. She completed education from Holy Cross Convent, Gampaha.  

At the age of 20, she married the businessman Kumarasiri Gunawardhana on October 18, 1981 by an arbitrary decision. They have one son named Kavinda Asanga Gunawardena, a graphic designer. Her husband died suddenly on February 10, 1992, when Vasanthi was 33 years old.

Career
Chathurani was a school girl when director Sumitra Peiris chose her for a lead role in Gehenu Lamai in 1978. Her most acclaimed role in the silver screen was that of 'Nirmala', a mentally-ill girl in the blockbuster Ganga Addara opposite late Vijaya Kumaratunga in 1980. She was mere nineteen-year-old at that time. I 1981, she was awarded Best Actress for her performance in this film, at the Sarasaviya Awards Festival and Presidential Awards.

She won the Sumathi Most Popular Actress Award in 1997 and the Sumathi Best Teledrama Actress Award in 1998, 2002 and 2009. Her career came to a temporary halt, when she got married in 1979, but was once again welcomed by her fans with her performance in Adara Hasuna. Some of her other successful films include Gehenu Lamai, Duwata Mawaka Misa and Sudu Sevanali. Vasanthi played dramatic roles in the films Amal Biso, Siribo Aiya, Hansa Vilak and Bththi Hathara. In 2003, she starred in the Lester James Peiris drama film Wekande Walauwa which received critic acclaim. 

Chathurani also made her mark as a teledrama actress, in shows such as Māyā Mandira, Iṭipahan, Chala Achala, Durgānthaya, Giraya, Hingana Kollā, Kadulla, Gajaman Nōnā and Kulavamiya. Chathurani recently got into teledrama productions, financing successful teledramas such as Aga Pipi Mal, Sedona and Ranga Soba. All three of them were directed by Premakumara Jayawardene and written by Sumitra Rahubadde. She has acted many genre television serials in Sri Lanka.

Selected TV serials

 Aga Pipi Mal
 Dahas Gawdura
 Denuwara Manike 
 Dhawala Kadulla 
 Diya Matha Ruwa 
 Durganthaya
 Gajaman Nona.
 Giraya
 Idorayaka Mal Pipila
 Ilandariyo 
 Ira Handa Payana Lokaya
 Itipahan
 Kadulla
 Kulawamiya
 Mano Mandira
 Pem Piyawara
 Ranga Madala Samu Gani
 Ranga Soba 
 Sedona 
 Senehase Geethaya 
 Senehase Nimnaya 
 Ulamage Rathriya
 Uththamavi
 Walakulu 
 Yaddehi Gedara
 Yaso Mandira

Filmography

Awards

Sarasaviya Awards

|-
|| 1980 ||| Ganga Addara || Best Actress ||

Sumathi Awards

|-
|| 1997 ||| People's Vote || Most Popular Actress ||  
|-
|| 1998 ||| Durganthaya || Best Actress ||  
|-
|| 2002 ||| Kulawamiya || Best Actress ||  
|-
|| 2006 ||| Aga Pipi Mal || Best Actress ||

Raigam Tele'es

|-
|| 2005 ||| Sedona || Best Actress ||  
|-
|| 2006 ||| Aga Pipi Mal || Best Actress ||

References

External links
Vasanthi Chathurani's Biography in Sinhala Cinema Database

Evergreen Sri Lankan Actress Vasanthi Chathurani

Living people
Sri Lankan film actresses
1960s births
20th-century Sri Lankan actresses
21st-century Sri Lankan actresses